The following is a list of churches in Gwynedd, a county in Wales.

Active churches 
The only community which probably has no active churches is Llanfrothen although Saint Brothen's Church still has the occasional service.

There is no online register of churches belonging to the Union of Welsh Independents, so the only source for UWI churches is the Coflein (historic buildings) register, at which point it becomes impossible to distinguish open from closed UWI churches.

The council area has an estimated 243 to 338 active churches for 123,600 inhabitants, a ratio of one church to every 366 to 509 inhabitants.

Defunct churches 
Churches that are known for a fact to be defunct are only included here if they are Church in Wales or Roman Catholic. Details of closed Nonconformist chapels can be found in the Coflein register.

References 

Gwynedd